Pokot or Pökoot may refer to:
the Pokot people
the Pokot language
Spoor (film), a 2017 Polish film

See also
 West Pokot County, Kenya